Nanhu may refer to the following in mainland China or Taiwan:

Nanhu Mountain (南湖大山), 3,740 m-high mountain in Taiwan
Nanhu District (南湖区), in Jiaxing, Zhejiang, China
Lakes (南湖)
South Lake (Nanning), Guangxi
South Lake (Wuhan), Hubei
South Lake (Changchun), Jilin
South Lake (Jiaxing), Zhejiang

Subdistricts (南湖街道)
Nanhu Subdistrict, Cangzhou, in Yunhe District, Cangzhou, Hebei
Nanhu Subdistrict, Huangzhou District, in Huanggang, Hubei
Nanhu Subdistrict, Macheng, in Macheng City, Huanggang, Hubei
Nanhu Subdistrict, Wuhan, in Wuchang District, Wuhan, Hubei
Nanhu, Yueyang, in Yueyanglou District, Yueyang, Hunan
Nanhu Subdistrict, Shenzhen, in Luohu District, Shenzhen, Guangdong
Nanhu Subdistrict, Nanning, in Qingxiu District, Nanning, Guangxi
Nanhu Subdistrict, Nanjing, in Jianye District, Nanjing, Jiangsu
Nanhu Subdistrict, Changchun, in Chaoyang District, Changchun, Jilin
Nanhu Subdistrict, Shenyang, in Heping District, Shenyang, Liaoning
Nanhu Subdistrict, Jiaxing, in Nanhu District, Jiaxing, Zhejiang

Towns (南湖镇)
Nanhu, Zhuanglang County, in Zhuanglang County, Gansu
Nanhu, Rizhao, in Donggang District, Rizhao, Shandong

Townships (南湖乡)
Nanhu Township, Xuancheng, in Xuanzhou District, Xuancheng, Anhui
Nanhu Township, Minqin County, in Minqin County, Gansu
Nanhu Township, Xinjiang, in Hami, Xinjiang

See also
 Nanhu Lake (disambiguation)